Andreas Vazaios (born 9 May 1994 in Athens) is a Greek swimmer. He competed in the 200 m individual medley event at the 2012 Summer Olympics and was eliminated after the qualifying heats.

At the 2016 Summer Olympics, he competed in the men's 200 m individual medley event. He finished 9th in the heats with a time of 1:59.33. He qualified for the semifinals where he placed 11th with a time of 1:59.54 and did not qualify for the final. He was a member of the men's 4 x 100 medley relay team which finished 15th in the heats and did not advance to the final.

He also swam for North Carolina State University where he won the NCAA Championship Twice in the 200 Yard Butterfly, he was member of a two times NCAA Champion 800 freestyle relay breaking the NCAA record, ACC record and school record. Andreas was the 2019 scholar athlete.

Andreas Vazaios is a member of the London Roar team, competing in Season 2 of the International Swimming League (ISL). The ISL is an annual professional swimming league featuring a team-based competition format with fast paced race sessions.

References

Living people
1994 births
Swimmers from Athens
Greek male swimmers
Olympic swimmers of Greece
Swimmers at the 2012 Summer Olympics
Swimmers at the 2016 Summer Olympics
Mediterranean Games gold medalists for Greece
Mediterranean Games silver medalists for Greece
Mediterranean Games bronze medalists for Greece
Swimmers at the 2013 Mediterranean Games
Swimmers at the 2018 Mediterranean Games
Mediterranean Games medalists in swimming
Male medley swimmers
Swimmers at the 2020 Summer Olympics
NC State Wolfpack men's swimmers
20th-century Greek people
21st-century Greek people
Swimmers at the 2022 Mediterranean Games